T'uruqucha (Quechua t'uru mud, qucha lake, "mud lake", also spelled Torococha) is a lake in the northern part of the Cordillera Blanca in the Andes of  Peru. It is located in the Ancash Region, Huaylas Province, Yuracmarca District, northeast of Pilanku.

References 

Lakes of Peru
Lakes of Ancash Region